Plooysburg is a small town about 70 km west of Kimberley, Northern Cape, South Africa. It is situated close to the Riet River. With a church, school, police station and shop it serves a local farming and farm-worker community. Nearby is the rock art site of Driekops Eiland, and the Mokala National Park.

References

Populated places in the Siyancuma Local Municipality
Karoo